Below are some notable researchers in cognitive neuroscience listed by topic of interest.

Language
 Steven Pinker
 Elizabeth Bates
 Brian MacWhinney
 Thomas Bever
 Marta Kutas
 Laura-Ann Petitto
 Morton Gernsbacher
 Angela D. Friederici
 Giordana Grossi

Memory
 Brenda Milner
 Daniel Schacter
 Endel Tulving
 Nancy Kanwisher
 James McGaugh
 Alexander Luria
 Morris Moscovitch
 Larry Squire

Vision
 David Marr
 Stephen Kosslyn
 Roger Shepard
 Brian Wandell
 Jerome Lettvin
 David Hubel
 Torsten Wiesel
 Leslie Ungerleider

Learning and Connectionism
 Joshua Vogelstein
 Cornelia Bargmann
 David Rumelhart
 James McClelland
 Jeffrey Elman
 Eric Kandel
 Annette Karmiloff-Smith
 Yuko Munakata
 Mark Johnson
 Donald O. Hebb
 Gina Rippon
 Daphna Joel

Laterality
 Roger Wolcott Sperry
 Michael Gazzaniga
 Wilder Penfield
 Stephen Kosslyn
 Elkhonon Goldberg
 Norman Geschwind

Emotion
 John Cacioppo
 C. Sue Carter
 António Damásio
 Richard Davidson
 Jean Decety
 Joseph E. LeDoux
 Jaak Panksepp
 Stephen Porges
 Robyn Bluhm

Other/Misc. Categories
 Brian Butterworth
 Gail Carpenter
 Stanislas Dehaene
 Stephen Grossberg
 Sam Harris
 Daniel Levitin
 Edvard Moser
 May-Britt Moser
 John O'Keefe (neuroscientist)
 George Ojemann
 Isabelle Peretz
 Michael Posner
 Vilayanur S. Ramachandran

See also
 List of cognitive scientists
 List of neuroscientists
 List of psychologists

List of cognitive neuroscientists